Pibrac is a commune in the Haute-Garonne department in southwestern France, located  west of Toulouse.

It has recently grown thanks to the development of the aeroplane industry in the nearby town of Blagnac.

Population
The inhabitants of the commune are known as Pibracaises and Pibracais in French.

Sport
Pibrac has a patinodrome, a track for inline speed skating, as well as many other sporting facilities.

Personalities
It was the birthplace of Saint Germaine Cousin.

Monuments
The Château de Pibrac is a converted 16th century castle which is listed as a historic site by the French Ministry of Culture.

Gallery

See also
Communes of the Haute-Garonne department

References

Communes of Haute-Garonne